Lucia  Frederica Rijker (born December 6, 1967) is a Dutch  professional boxer, kickboxer, and actress.

Rijker was sometimes dubbed by the press "The Most Dangerous Woman in the World".

Early career

Rijker speaks four languages and is a Buddhist, dedicating time daily to meditation and chanting. Her mother was born in the Netherlands and her father is from Suriname.

Rijker started her martial arts career at the early age of six, when she began training in judo. A year later, she was part of the Dutch National Softball Team. At fourteen, after picking up fencing a year earlier, Lucia became the Netherlands Junior Champion of that sport. When she was fifteen she began kickboxing and knocked out the reigning American kickboxing champion, Lily Rodriguez. Rijker eventually amassed a 36-0 (25 KO) record as a kickboxer, and won four different world titles. Her only defeat in a kickboxing ring was in an exhibition match at Sporthallen Zuid in Amsterdam in October 1994, when she fought male Muay Thai fighter Somchai Jaidee, who knocked her out in the second round.

Career change
After winning her first 14 fights, but failing to secure a match with Christy Martin, Rijker stepped away from boxing in 1999 to pursue a career in Hollywood. She appeared as Billie 'The Blue Bear' Osterman in 2004's Oscar-winning, female boxer-based film Million Dollar Baby and was featured in the documentary film Shadow Boxers. She played a minor role in Rollerball and had a brief cameo in the season 2 finale of The L Word as Dana's trainer. She returned to The L Word in Season 5 as Dusty, Helena's cellmate in prison. Rijker played a Romulan communications officer in the film Star Trek.

Return to the ring
She returned to the ring in February 2002, beating Jane Couch (20-4 going in; 25-6 as of December 2004) by decision (eight rounds) on June 21, 2003 for her 16th win. Win number 17 was a ten-round decision over "Sun shine” Fettkether on May 20, 2004.

Rijker and Christy Martin were scheduled to fight on July 30, 2005 at the Mandalay Bay in Las Vegas. Major U.S. promoter Bob Arum (Top Rank Boxing's head) had made their match the main event of a card (with otherwise male boxing matches) called "Million Dollar Lady". Each woman was guaranteed $250,000 (U.S.), with the winner receiving an extra $750,000; however, on July 20, it was announced that she had ruptured an Achilles tendon while training for the fight; recovery time was estimated to be 4–7 months. The match was ultimately cancelled.

In 2006, Rijker stated that although not retired as a professional boxer, she would only consider one more fight - a bout with Laila Ali.

Boxing records
As of February 2007, she was undefeated in the ring; her boxing record is 17-0 (14 K.O.'s).

Rijker has been on the cover of numerous magazines including Inside Kung Fu. As a professional boxer, she has won the WIBF Welterweight Title, and has beaten name fighters such as Marcela Acuña (5th-round K.O.; Acuña was 0-1 going into the fight, and retired with a record of 42-6-1), and Deborah "Sunshine" Fettkether (10th-round decision; Fettkether was 8-4-3 going in).

Current activities
For several years, Rijker has been training under the world-famous boxing coach Freddie Roach. In 2012, she was hired as a striking coach to former UFC Champion Ronda Rousey.

She remains busy giving lectures and seminars to athletes and people from all walks of life to perform their best, while still maintaining her top physical form and a strict diet.

Rijker once again gained media attention in June 2013, when she worked in the corner of female boxing challenger Diana Prazak in her WBC super featherweight title bout against local champion Frida Wallberg in Stockholm, Sweden.  Prazak knocked Wallberg down twice in the eighth round prompting the referee to stop the fight.  After a brief check by the ringside doctor, Wallberg started to collapse in her corner.  Rijker immediately realized the seriousness of the situation and called the doctor back to the ring while she and Prazak assisted Wallberg. Wallberg had to be carried from the ring on a stretcher to hospital and underwent surgery with a cerebral hemorrhage. This event sparked controversy about the level of the provided medical attention and reignited debates about banning boxing in Sweden.

In 2014, Rijker was part of the inaugural class of the International Women's Boxing Hall of Fame in Fort Lauderdale, Florida.  

In 2019, Rijker became one of the first three women boxers (and the first Dutch woman boxer) elected to the International Boxing Hall of Fame; 2019 was the first year that women were on the ballot.

In 2017, Rijker hosted the Dutch adaptation of Jamie's Dream School; as well as in 2018, 2019 and 2020.

Championships and accomplishments

Kickboxing
1988–1989 — IWBA Women's Boxing World Champion
1985–1994 — WKA Women's Division World Champion
1989–1994 — ISKA Women's Division World Champion

Boxing
1997 - WIBF Super Lightweight World Champion
1998 - WIBO Junior Welterweight World Champion
1997–1998 — European WIBF Boxing Champion

Kickboxing record

|-
|-  bgcolor="CCFFCC"
| 1994-04-30 || Win ||align=left| Sandra Moore || K-1 Grand Prix '94 || Tokyo, Japan || Decision (unanimous) || 5 || 3:00 || 
|-
|-  bgcolor="CCFFCC"
| 1993-12-19 || Win ||align=left| Yoriko Okamoto || K-2 Grand Prix '93 || Tokyo, Japan || TKO (right low kick) || 2 || 0:38 || 
|-
|-  bgcolor="CCFFCC"
| 1993-09-04 || Win ||align=left| Kyoko Kamikaze || K-1 Illusion || Tokyo, Japan || TKO || 2 || 0:44 || 
|-
|-  bgcolor="CCFFCC"
| 1992-05-17 || Win ||align=left| Michele Aboro || || Hamburg, Germany || TKO || || || 
|-
|-  bgcolor="CCFFCC"
| 1992-00-00 || Win ||align=left| Kathy Petereit || || Amsterdam, Netherlands || TKO || 1 || || 
|-
|-  bgcolor="CCFFCC"
| 1991-10-06 || Win ||align=left| Sandra Moore || || || Decision || 5 || 3:00 || 
|-
|-  bgcolor="CCFFCC"
| 1991-07-03 || Win ||align=left| Sanchez || || Netherlands || Decision || || || 
|-
! style=background:white colspan=9 |
|-
|-  bgcolor="CCFFCC"
| 1991-06-00 || Win ||align=left| Michele Aboro || || Oldham, England || TKO || 1 || || 
|-
! style=background:white colspan=9 |
|-
|-  bgcolor="CCFFCC"
| 1990-11-18 || Win ||align=left| Maxine Adams || || || KO || 1 || || 
|-
|-  bgcolor="CCFFCC"
| 1989-10-08 || Win ||align=left| Paola Zarbo || ||Amsterdam, Netherlands || KO || 1 || || 
|-
|-  bgcolor="CCFFCC"
| 1988-10-00 || Win ||align=left| Ruth O'Hara || || Japan || || || || 
|-
|-  bgcolor="CCFFCC"
| 1988-02-14 || Win ||align=left| Daniëlle Roccard || || Arnhem, Netherlands || TKO || 1 || 0:15 || 
|-
|-  bgcolor="CCFFCC"
| 1987-11-08 || Win ||align=left| Valérie Hénin || || Amsterdam, Netherlands || TKO || 4 || || 
|-
! style=background:white colspan=9 |
|-
|-  bgcolor="CCFFCC"
| 0000-00-00 || Win ||align=left| Bonnie Canino || || || Decision || 7 || 2:00 || 
|-
|-  bgcolor="CCFFCC"
| 1987-04-26 || Win ||align=left| Anne Holmes || || Amsterdam, Netherlands || TKO || 1 || 0:30 || 
|-
|-  bgcolor="CCFFCC"
| 1985-10-06 || Win ||align=left| Cheryl Wheeler || || Amsterdam, Netherlands || Decision (unanimous) || 7 || 2:00 || 
|-
! style=background:white colspan=9 |
|-
|-  bgcolor="CCFFCC"
| 1985-05-26 || Win ||align=left| Nancy Vesula || || Amsterdam, Netherlands || TKO || 2 || || 
|-
! style=background:white colspan=9 |
|-
|-  bgcolor="CCFFCC"
| 1985-03-04 || Win ||align=left| Ermelinda Fernandez || || Clermont-Ferrand, France || KO || 2 || || 
|-
|-  bgcolor="CCFFCC"
| 1984-01-15 || Win ||align=left| Lilly Rodriuez || || Amsterdam, Netherlands || KO (low kick) || 1 || 0:30 || 6-0-1
|-
! style=background:white colspan=9 |
|-
|-  bgcolor="CCFFCC"
| 1983-09-04 || Win ||align=left| Linda Lladossa || || Amsterdam, Netherlands || Decision (unanimous) || || || 
|-
|-  bgcolor="CCFFCC"
| 1983-06-00 || Win ||align=left| Catherine Zanzouri || || Paris, France || KO || 3 || || 
|-
|-  bgcolor="CCFFCC"
| 1983-00-00 || Win ||align=left| Nancy Joseph || || Amsterdam, Netherlands || TKO (doctor stoppage) || 1 || || 
|-
|-  bgcolor="#c5d2ea"
| 1983-06-29 || Draw ||align=left| Linda Lladossa || || Amsterdam, Netherlands || Draw || || || 
|-
|-  bgcolor="CCFFCC"
| 1982-11-04 || Win ||align=left| Sandra Oostendorp || || Amsterdam, Netherlands || || || || 
|-
|-
| colspan=9 | Legend:    

|-  style="background:#fbb;"
|1994-10-15 ||Loss ||align=left| Somchai Jaidee ||||Amsterdam, Netherlands ||KO|| 2 ||  || 0–1
|-
|-
| colspan=9 | Legend:

Professional boxing record

References

External links

1967 births
Living people
Dutch women boxers
Dutch Buddhists
Dutch female kickboxers
Dutch female fencers
Dutch Muay Thai practitioners
Dutch sportspeople of Surinamese descent
Boxers from Amsterdam
Dutch film actresses